Kadankoppa is a village in Dharwad district of Karnataka, India.

Demographics 
As of the 2011 Census of India there were 300 households in Kadankoppa and a total population of 1,448 consisting of 782 males and 666 females. There were 184 children ages 0-6.

References

Villages in Dharwad district